Head and neck cancer develops from tissues in the lip and oral cavity (mouth), larynx (throat), salivary glands, nose, sinuses or the skin of the face. The most common types of head and neck cancers occur in the lip, mouth, and larynx. Symptoms predominantly include a sore that does not heal or a change in the voice. In those with advanced disease, there may be unusual bleeding, facial pain, numbness or swelling, and visible lumps on the outside of the neck or oral cavity. Given the location of these cancers, trouble breathing may also be present. 

The majority of head and neck cancer is caused by the use of alcohol or tobacco, including smokeless tobacco, with increasing cases linked to the human papillomavirus (HPV). Other risk factors include Epstein-Barr virus, betel quid, radiation exposure, certain workplace exposures. About 90% are pathologically classified as squamous cell cancers. The diagnosis is confirmed by tissue biopsy. The degree of surrounding tissue invasion and distant spread may be determined by medical imaging and blood tests.

Not using tobacco or alcohol can reduce the risk for head and neck cancer. The HPV vaccine may reduce the lifetime risk of oral cancer if taken prior to the onset of sexual activity, but confirmation will likely not be known until around 2060. This is because oropharyngeal cancer typical presents in the 4th – 6th decade of life, and this is a relatively new vaccine. While screening in the general population does not appear to be useful, screening high risk groups by examination of the throat might be useful. Head and neck cancer often is curable if it is diagnosed early; however, outcomes are typically poor if it is diagnosed late. Treatment may include a combination of surgery, radiation therapy, chemotherapy, and targeted therapy. Previous diagnosis and treatment of one head and neck cancer confers higher risk of developing a second head and neck cancer or recurrence.

Globally, head and neck cancer accounts for 650,000 new cases of cancer and 330,000 deaths annually on average. In 2018, it was the seventh most common cancer worldwide with 890,000 new cases documented and 450,000 dying from the disease. In the United States, head and neck cancer makes up 3% of all cancer cases (averaging 53,000 new diagnoses per year) and 1.5% of cancer deaths. The 2017 worldwide figure cites head and neck cancers as representing 5.3% of all cancers (not including non-melanoma skin cancers).  Notably, head and neck cancer secondary to chronic alcohol or tobacco use has been steadily declining as less of the population chronically smokes tobacco. However, HPV-associated oropharyngeal cancer is rising, particularly in younger people in westernized nations, which is thought to be reflective of changes in oral sexual practices, specifically with regard to the number of oral sexual partners. This increase since the 1970s has mostly affected wealthier nations and male populations. This is due to evidence suggesting that transmission rates of HPV from women to men are higher than men to women, as women often have a higher immune response to infection.

The usual age at diagnosis is between 55 and 65 years old. The average 5-year survival following diagnosis in the developed world is 42–64%.

Signs and symptoms
Symptoms predominantly include a sore of the face or oral cavity that does not heal, trouble swallowing, or a change in the voice. In those with advanced disease, there may be unusual bleeding, facial pain, numbness or swelling, and visible lumps on the outside of the neck or oral cavity. Head and neck cancer often begins with benign signs and symptoms of disease, like an enlarged lymph node on the outside of the neck, a hoarse-sounding voice or progressive worsening cough or sore throat. In the case of head and neck cancer, these symptoms will be notably persistent and become chronic. There may be a lump or a sore in the throat or neck that does not heal or go away. There may be difficult or painful swallowing. Speaking may become difficult. There may also be a persistent earache.

Other symptoms can include: a lump in the lip, mouth or gums, ulcers or mouth sores that do not heal, bleeding from the mouth or numbness, bad breath, discolored patches that persist in the mouth, a sore tongue, and slurring of speech if the cancer is affecting the tongue. There may also be congested sinuses, weight loss, and some numbness or paralysis of facial muscles.

Mouth

Squamous cell cancers are common in areas of the mouth, including the inner lip, tongue, floor of mouth, gums, and hard palate. Cancers of the mouth are strongly associated with tobacco use, especially use of chewing tobacco or dipping tobacco, as well as heavy alcohol use. Cancers of this region, particularly the tongue, are more frequently treated with surgery than are other head and neck cancers. Lip and oral cavity cancers are the most typically encountered type of head and neck cancers.

Surgeries for oral cancers include:
 Maxillectomy (can be done with or without orbital exenteration)
 Mandibulectomy (removal of the lower jaw or part of it)
 Glossectomy (tongue removal, can be total, hemi or partial)
 Radical neck dissection
 Combinational e.g., glossectomy and laryngectomy done together.

The defect is typically covered/improved by using another part of the body and/or skin grafts and/or wearing a prosthesis.

Nose

Paranasal sinus and nasal cavity cancer affects the nasal cavity and the paranasal sinuses. Most of these cancers are squamous cell carcinomas.

Nasopharynx

Nasopharyngeal cancer arises in the nasopharynx, the region in which the nasal cavities and the Eustachian tubes connect with the upper part of the throat. While some nasopharyngeal cancers are biologically similar to the common head and neck squamous cell carcinomas (HNSCCs), "poorly differentiated" nasopharyngeal carcinoma is lymphoepithelioma, which is distinct in its epidemiology, biology, clinical behavior, and treatment, and is treated as a separate disease by many experts.

Throat

Most oropharyngeal cancers are squamous cell carcinomas that begin in the oropharynx (throat), the middle part of the throat that includes the soft palate, the base of the tongue, and the tonsils. Squamous cell cancers of the tonsils are more strongly associated with human papillomavirus infection than are cancers of other regions of the head and neck. HPV-positive oropharyngeal cancer generally has a better outcomes than HPV-negative disease with a 54% better survival, but this advantage for HPV associated cancer applies only to oropharyngeal cancers.

People with oropharyngeal carcinomas are at high risk of developing second primary head and neck cancer.

Hypopharynx

The hypopharynx includes the pyriform sinuses, the posterior pharyngeal wall, and the postcricoid area. Tumors of the hypopharynx frequently have an advanced stage at diagnosis, and have the most adverse prognoses of pharyngeal tumors. They tend to metastasize early due to the extensive lymphatic network around the larynx.

Larynx

Laryngeal cancer begins in the larynx or "voice box", and is the second most common type of head and neck cancer encountered. Cancer may occur on the vocal folds themselves ("glottic" cancer), or on tissues above and below the true cords ("supraglottic" and "subglottic" cancers respectively). Laryngeal cancer is strongly associated with tobacco smoking.

Surgery can include laser excision of small vocal cord lesions, partial laryngectomy (removal of part of the larynx) or total laryngectomy (removal of the whole larynx). If the whole larynx has been removed, the person is left with a permanent tracheostomy. Voice rehabilitation in such patients can be achieved through three important ways – esophageal speech, tracheoesophageal puncture, or electrolarynx. One would likely require the help of intensive teaching and speech therapy and/or an electronic device.

Trachea
Cancer of the trachea is a rare cancer usually classed as a lung cancer.

Most tumors of the salivary glands differ from the common squamous cell carcinomas of the head and neck in cause, histopathology, clinical presentation, and therapy. Other uncommon tumors arising in the head and neck include teratomas, adenocarcinomas, adenoid cystic carcinomas, and mucoepidermoid carcinomas. Rarer still are melanomas and lymphomas of the upper aerodigestive tract.

Causes

Alcohol and tobacco

Around 75% of cases are caused by alcohol and tobacco use.

Tobacco smoking is one of the main risk factors for head and neck cancer. A major carcinogenic compound in tobacco smoke is acrylonitrile. Acrylonitrile appears to indirectly cause DNA damage by increasing oxidative stress, leading to increased levels of 8-oxo-2'-deoxyguanosine (8-oxo-dG) and formamidopyrimidine in DNA. (see image). Both 8-oxo-dG and formamidopyrimidine are mutagenic. DNA glycosylase NEIL1 prevents mutagenesis by 8-oxo-dG and removes formamidopyrimidines from DNA.

However, cigarette smokers have a lifetime increased risk for head and neck cancers that is 5- to 25-fold increased over the general population.
The ex-smoker's risk for developing a head and neck cancer begins to approach the risk in the general population 15 years after smoking cessation. The high prevalence of tobacco and alcohol use worldwide and the high association of these cancers with these substances makes them ideal targets for enhanced cancer prevention.

Smokeless tobacco is a cause of oral cancer and oropharyngeal cancer.  Smokeless tobacco (including products where tobacco is chewed) is associated with a risk of developing head and neck cancers; this link has been established in the United States as well as in East Asian countries.Cigar smoking is also an important risk factor for oral cancer. It should also be noted that the use of electronic cigarettes may also lead to the development of head and neck cancers due to the substances like propylene glycol, glycerol, nitrosamines and metals contained there in; which can cause damage to airways. This area of study requires more research to prove correlation and/or causation, however.

Other environmental carcinogens suspected of being potential causes of head and neck cancer include occupational exposures such as nickel ore refining, exposure to textile fibers, and woodworking. Use of marijuana, especially when younger, has been linked to an increase in squamous-cell carcinoma cases in at least one study, while other studies suggest use is not shown to be associated with oral squamous cell carcinoma, or associated with decreased squamous cell carcinoma.

Diet
Excessive consumption of eggs, processed meats, and red meat were associated with increased rates of cancer of the head and neck in one study, while consumption of raw and cooked vegetables seemed to be protective.

Vitamin E was not found to prevent the development of leukoplakia, the white plaques that are the precursor for carcinomas of the mucosal surfaces, in adult smokers.
Another study examined a combination of Vitamin E and beta carotene in smokers with early-stage cancer of the oropharynx, and found a worse prognosis in the vitamin users.

Betel nut
Betel nut chewing is associated with an increased risk of squamous cell cancer of the head and neck.

Infection

Human papillomavirus
Some head and neck cancers are caused by human papillomavirus (HPV). In particular, HPV16 is a causal factor for some head and neck squamous-cell carcinomas (HNSCCs). Approximately 15–25% of HNSCC contain genomic DNA from HPV, and the association varies based on the site of the tumor, especially HPV-positive oropharyngeal cancer, with highest distribution in the tonsils, where
HPV DNA is found in (45 to 67%) of the cases, less often in the hypopharynx (13–25%), and least often in the oral cavity (12–18%) and larynx (3–7%).

Some experts estimate that while up to 50% of cancers of the tonsil may be infected with HPV, only 50% of these are likely to be caused by HPV (as opposed to the usual tobacco and alcohol causes). The role of HPV in the remaining 25–30% is not yet clear. Oral sex is not risk free and results in a significant proportion of HPV-related head and neck cancer.

Positive HPV16 status is associated with improved prognosis over HPV-negative OSCC.

HPV can induce tumor by several mechanisms:
 E6 and E7 oncogenic proteins.
 Disruption of tumor suppressor genes.
 High-level DNA amplifications, for example, oncogenes.
 Generating alternative nonfunctional transcripts.
 interchromosomal rearrangements.
 Distinct host genome methylation and expression patterns, produced even when virus isn't integrated into the host genome.

Induction of cancer can be associated for the expression of viral oncoproteins, the most important E6 and E7, or other mechanisms many of them run by the integration such as the generation of altered transcripts, disruption of tumor suppressors, high levels of DNA amplifications, interchromosomial rearrangements, or changes in DNA methylation patterns, the latter being able to find even when the virus is identified in episomes. E6 sequesters p53 to promote p53 degradation while E7 inhibits pRb. p53 prevents cell growth when DNA is damaged by activating apoptosis and p21, a kinase that blocks the formation of cyclin D / Cdk4 avoiding pRb phosphorylation and thereby prevents release of E2F is a transcription factor required for activation of genes involved in cell proliferation. pRb remains bound to E2F while this action phosphorylated preventing activation of proliferation. Therefore, E6 and E7 act synergistically in triggering cell cycle progression and therefore uncontrolled proliferation by inactivating the p53 and Rb tumor suppressors.

Viral integration tends to occur in or near oncogenes or tumor suppressor genes and it is for this reason that the integration of the virus can greatly contribute to the development of tumor characteristics.

Epstein–Barr virus
Epstein–Barr virus (EBV) infection is associated with nasopharyngeal cancer. Nasopharyngeal cancer occurs endemically in some countries of the Mediterranean and Asia, where EBV antibody titers can be measured to screen high-risk populations. Nasopharyngeal cancer has also been associated with consumption of salted fish, which may contain high levels of nitrites.

Gastroesophageal reflux disease
The presence of acid reflux disease (gastroesophageal reflux disease [GERD]) or larynx reflux disease can also be a major factor. Stomach acids that flow up through the esophagus can damage its lining and raise susceptibility to throat cancer.

Hematopoietic stem cell transplantation
Patients after hematopoietic stem cell transplantation (HSCT) are at a higher risk for oral squamous cell carcinoma. Post-HSCT oral cancer may have more aggressive behavior with poorer prognosis, when compared to oral cancer in non-HSCT patients. This effect is supposed to be owing to the continuous lifelong immune suppression and chronic oral graft-versus-host disease.

Other possible causes
There are several risk factors for developing throat cancer. These include smoking or chewing tobacco or other things, such as gutkha, or paan, heavy alcohol consumption, poor diet resulting in vitamin deficiencies (worse if this is caused by heavy alcohol intake), weakened immune system, asbestos exposure, prolonged exposure to wood dust or paint fumes, exposure to petroleum industry chemicals, and being over the age of 55 years.

Diagnosis

A person usually presents to the physician complaining of  The person will typically undergo a needle biopsy of this lesion, and a histopathologic information is available, a multidisciplinary discussion of the optimal treatment strategy will be undertaken between the radiation oncologist, surgical oncologist, and medical oncologist. Most (90%) cancers of the head and neck are squamous cell-derived termed as "head-and-neck squamous-cell carcinomas".

Histopathology
Throat cancers are classified according to their histology or cell structure, and are commonly referred to by their location in the oral cavity and neck. This is because where the cancer appears in the throat affects the prognosis – some throat cancers are more aggressive than others depending upon their location. The stage at which the cancer is diagnosed is also a critical factor in the prognosis of throat cancer. Treatment guidelines recommend routine testing for the presence of HPV for all oropharyngeal squamous cell carcinoma tumours.

Squamous-cell carcinoma
Squamous-cell carcinoma is a cancer of the squamous cell – a kind of epithelial cell found in both the skin and mucous membranes. It accounts for over 90% of all head and neck cancers, including more than 90% of throat cancer. Squamous cell carcinoma is most likely to appear in males over 40 years of age with a history of heavy alcohol use coupled with smoking.

The tumor marker Cyfra 21-1 may be useful in diagnosing squamous cell carcinoma of the head/neck (SCCHN).

Adenocarcinoma
Adenocarcinoma is a cancer of epithelial tissue that has glandular characteristics. Several head and neck cancers are adenocarcinomas (either of intestinal or non-intestinal cell-type).

Prevention
Avoidance of recognised risk factors (as described above) is the single most effective form of prevention. Regular dental examinations may identify pre-cancerous lesions in the oral cavity.

When diagnosed early, oral, head and neck cancers can be treated more easily and the chances of survival increase tremendously. As of 2017 it was not known if existing HPV vaccines can help prevent head and neck cancer.

Management

Improvements in diagnosis and local management, as well as targeted therapy, have led to improvements in quality of life and survival for people with head and neck cancer.

After a histologic diagnosis has been established and tumor extent determined, the selection of appropriate treatment for a specific cancer depends on a complex array of variables, including tumor site, relative morbidity of various treatment options, concomitant health problems, social and logistic factors, previous primary tumors, and the person's preference. Treatment planning generally requires a multidisciplinary approach involving specialist surgeons and medical and radiation oncologists. 

Surgical resection and radiation therapy are the mainstays of treatment for most head and neck cancers and remain the standard of care in most cases. For small primary cancers without regional metastases (stage I or II), wide surgical excision alone or curative radiation therapy alone is used. More extensive primary tumors, or those with regional metastases (stage III or IV), planned combinations of pre- or postoperative radiation and complete surgical excision are generally used. More recently, as historical survival and control rates are recognized as less than satisfactory, there has been an emphasis on the use of various induction or concomitant chemotherapy regimens.

Surgery
Surgery as a treatment is frequently used in most types of head and neck cancer. Usually the goal is to remove the cancerous cells entirely. This can be particularly tricky if the cancer is near the larynx and can result in the person being unable to speak. Surgery is also commonly used to resect (remove) some or all of the cervical lymph nodes to prevent further spread of the disease.

CO2 laser surgery is also another form of treatment. Transoral laser microsurgery allows surgeons to remove tumors from the voice box with no external incisions. It also allows access to tumors that are not reachable with robotic surgery. During the surgery, surgeon and pathologist work together to assess the adequacy of excision ("margin status"), minimizing the amount of normal tissue removed or damaged. This technique helps give the person as much speech and swallowing function as possible after surgery.

Radiation therapy

Radiation therapy is the most common form of treatment. There are different forms of radiation therapy, including 3D conformal radiation therapy, intensity-modulated radiation therapy, particle beam therapy and brachytherapy, which are commonly used in the treatments of cancers of the head and neck. Most people with head and neck cancer who are treated in the United States and Europe are treated with intensity-modulated radiation therapy using high energy photons. At higher doses, head and neck radiation is associated with thyroid dysfunction and pituitary axis dysfunction. Radiation therapy of head and neck cancers can also cause acute skin reactions of varying levels of severity, which can be treated and managed with topically applied creams or specialist films.

Chemotherapy
Chemotherapy in throat cancer is not generally used to cure the cancer as such. Instead, it is used to provide an inhospitable environment for metastases so that they will not establish in other parts of the body. Typical chemotherapy agents are a combination of paclitaxel and carboplatin. Cetuximab is also used in the treatment of throat cancer.

Docetaxel-based chemotherapy has shown a very good response in locally advanced head and neck cancer. Docetaxel is the only taxane approved by US FDA for head and neck cancer, in combination with cisplatin and fluorouracil for the induction treatment of inoperable, locally advanced squamous cell carcinoma of the head and neck.

While not specifically a chemotherapy, amifostine is often administered intravenously by a chemotherapy clinic prior to IMRT radiotherapy sessions. Amifostine protects the gums and salivary glands from the effects of radiation.

There is no evidence that erythropoietin should be routinely given with radiotherapy.

Photodynamic therapy
Photodynamic therapy may have promise in treating mucosal dysplasia and small head and neck tumors. Amphinex is giving good results in early clinical trials for treatment of advanced head and neck cancer.

Targeted therapy
Targeted therapy, according to the National Cancer Institute, is "a type of treatment that uses drugs or other substances, such as monoclonal antibodies, to identify and attack specific cancer cells without harming normal cells." Some targeted therapy used in squamous cell cancers of the head and neck include cetuximab, bevacizumab and erlotinib.

The best quality data are available for cetuximab since the 2006 publication of a randomized clinical trial comparing radiation treatment plus cetuximab versus radiation treatment alone. This study found that concurrent cetuximab and radiotherapy improves survival and locoregional disease control compared to radiotherapy alone, without a substantial increase in side effects, as would be expected with the concurrent chemoradiotherapy, which is the current gold standard treatment for advanced head and neck cancer. Whilst this study is of pivotal significance, interpretation is difficult since cetuximab-radiotherapy was not directly compared to chemoradiotherapy. The results of ongoing studies to clarify the role of cetuximab in this disease are awaited with interest.

Another study evaluated the impact of adding cetuximab to conventional chemotherapy (cisplatin) versus cisplatin alone. This study found no improvement in survival or disease-free survival with the addition of cetuximab to the conventional chemotherapy.

However, another study which completed in March 2007 found that there was an improvement in survival.

A 2010 review concluded that the combination of cetuximab and platin/5-fluorouracil should be considered the current standard first-line regimen.

Gendicine is a gene therapy that employs an adenovirus to deliver the tumor suppressor gene p53 to cells. It was approved in China in 2003 for the treatment of head and neck squamous cell carcinoma.

The mutational profile of HPV+ and HPV- head and neck cancer has been reported, further demonstrating that they are fundamentally distinct diseases.

Immunotherapy
Immunotherapy is a type of treatment that activates the immune system to fight cancer. One type of immunotherapy, immune checkpoint blockade, binds to and blocks inhibitory signals on immune cells to release their anti-cancer activities.

In 2016, the FDA granted accelerated approval to pembrolizumab for the treatment of people with recurrent or metastatic HNSCC with disease progression on or after platinum-containing chemotherapy. Later that year, the FDA approved nivolumab for the treatment of recurrent or metastatic HNSCC with disease progression on or after platinum-based chemotherapy. In 2019, the FDA approved pembrolizumab for the first-line treatment of metastatic or unresectable recurrent HNSCC.

Treatment side effects
Depending on the treatment used, people with head and neck cancer may experience the following symptoms and treatment side effects:

Eating problems
Pain associated with lesions
Mucositis
Nephrotoxicity and ototoxicity
Xerostomia
Gastroesophageal reflux
Radiation-induced osteonecrosis of the jaw 
Radiation-induced acute skin reactions

Psychosocial 
Programs to support the emotional and social well-being of people who have been diagnosed with head and neck cancer may be offered. There is no clear evidence on the effectiveness of these interventions or any particular type of psychosocial program or length of time that is the most helpful for those with head and neck cancer.

Prognosis
Although early-stage head and neck cancers (especially laryngeal and oral cavity) have high cure rates, up to 50% of people with head and neck cancer present with advanced disease.
Cure rates decrease in locally advanced cases, whose probability of cure is inversely related to tumor size and even more so to the extent of regional node involvement.  HPV-associated oropharyngeal cancer has been shown to respond better to chemoradiation and, subsequently, a better prognosis, compared to non-associated HPV head and neck cancer.

Consensus panels in America (AJCC) and Europe (UICC) have established staging systems for head and neck squamous-cell cancers. These staging systems attempt to standardize clinical trial criteria for research studies, and attempt to define prognostic categories of disease. Squamous cell cancers of the head and neck are staged according to the TNM classification system, where T is the size and configuration of the tumor, N is the presence or absence of lymph node metastases, and M is the presence or absence of distant metastases. The T, N, and M characteristics are combined to produce a "stage" of the cancer, from I to IVB.

Problem of second primaries
Survival advantages provided by new treatment modalities have been undermined by the significant percentage of people cured of head and neck squamous cell carcinoma (HNSCC) who subsequently develop second primary tumors. The incidence of second primary tumors ranges in studies from 9%
to 23%
at 20 years. Second primary tumors are the major threat to long-term survival after successful therapy of early-stage HNSCC. Their high incidence results from the same carcinogenic exposure responsible for the initial primary process, called field cancerization.

Digestive system
Many people with head and neck cancer are also not able to eat sufficiently. A tumor may impair a person's ability to swallow and eat, and throat cancer may affect the digestive system. The difficulty in swallowing can lead to a person to choke on their food in the early stages of digestion and interfere with the food's smooth travels down into the esophagus and beyond.

The treatments for throat cancer can also be harmful to the digestive system as well as other body systems. Radiation therapy can lead to nausea and vomiting, which can deprive a body of vital fluids (although these may be obtained through intravenous fluids if necessary). Frequent vomiting can lead to an electrolyte imbalance which has serious consequences for the proper functioning of the heart. Frequent vomiting can also upset the balance of stomach acids which has a negative impact on the digestive system, especially the lining of the stomach and esophagus.

Enteral feeding, a method that adds nutrients directly into a person's stomach using a nasogastric feeding tube or a gastrostomy tube, may be necessary for some people. Further research is required to determine the most effective method of enteral feeding to ensure that people undergoing radiotherapy or chemoradiation treatment are able to stay nourished during their treatment.

Respiratory system
In the cases of some throat cancers, the air passages in the mouth and behind the nose may become blocked from lumps or the swelling from the open sores. If the throat cancer is near the bottom of the throat, it has a high likelihood of spreading to the lungs and interfering with the person's ability to breathe; this is even more likely if the person is a smoker, because they are highly susceptible to lung cancer.

Mental health 
Cancer in the head or neck may impact a person's mental well-being and can sometimes lead to social isolation. This largely results from decreased ability or inability to eat, speak or effectively communicate. Physical appearance is often altered by both the cancer itself or as a consequence of treatment side effects. Psychological distress may occur and feelings such as uncertainty and fear may arise. Some people may also have a changed physical appearance, differences in swallowing or breathing, and residual pain to manage.

Patient Experience 
Increased Caregiver Distress Unique to care for Head and Neck Cancer Patients

Multiple studies have shown caregivers for head and neck cancer patients show higher rates of distress and poorer mental health compared to both the general population as well as those caring for non-head-and-neck cancer patients. The high symptom burden patients' experience necessitate complex caregiver roles, often requiring hospital staff training, which caregivers can find distressing when asked to do so for the first time. It is becoming increasingly apparent caregivers (most often spouses, children or close family members) might not be adequately informed about, nor prepared or trained for the tasks and roles he/she will encounter during the treatment and recovery phase for this unique patient population, which span both technical and emotional support. Of note, caregivers of patient's who report lower quality of life, demonstrate increased burden and fatigue that extents beyond the treatment phase.

Examples of technically difficult caregiver duties include: tube feeding, oral suctioning, wound maintenance, medication delivery safe for tube feeding, and trouble shooting at home medical equipment. If the cancer affect the mouth or larynx, caregivers must also find a way to effectively communicate amongst themselves and with their healthcare team. This is in addition to providing emotional support for the person undergoing cancer therapy.

Others
Like any cancer, metastasization affects many areas of the body, as the cancer spreads from cell to cell and organ to organ. For example, if it spreads to the bone marrow, it will prevent the body from producing enough red blood cells and affects the proper functioning of the white blood cells and the body's immune system; spreading to the circulatory system will prevent oxygen from being transported to all the cells of the body; and throat cancer can throw the nervous system into chaos, making it unable to properly regulate and control the body.

Epidemiology

The number of new cases of head and neck cancers in the United States was 40,490 in 2006, accounting for about 3% of adult malignancies. A total of 11,170 people died of their disease in 2006. The worldwide incidence exceeds half a million cases annually. In North America and Europe, the tumors usually arise from the oral cavity, oropharynx, or larynx, whereas nasopharyngeal cancer is more common in the Mediterranean countries and in the Far East. In Southeast China and Taiwan, head and neck cancer, specifically nasopharyngeal cancer, is the most-common cause of death in young men.

 In 2008, there were 22,900 cases of oral cavity cancer, 12,250 cases of laryngeal cancer, and 12,410 cases of pharyngeal cancer in the United States.
 In 2002, 7,400 Americans were projected to die of these cancers.
 More than 70% of throat cancers are at an advanced stage when discovered.
 Men are 89% more likely than women to be diagnosed with, and are almost twice as likely to die of these cancers.
 African Americans are disproportionately affected by head and neck cancer, with younger ages of incidence, increased mortality, and more advanced disease at presentation. Laryngeal cancer incidence is higher in African Americans relative to white, Asian, and Hispanic populations. There is a lower survival rate for similar tumor states in African Americans with head and neck cancer.
 Smoking and tobacco use are directly related to oropharyngeal (throat) cancer deaths.
 The risk of developing head and neck cancers increases with age, especially after 50 years. Most people who do so are between 50 and 70 years old.

Research
Immunotherapy with immune checkpoint inhibitors is being investigated in head and neck cancers.

References

External links 

 Head and Neck Cancer at MedlinePlus (National Library of Medicine)
 Head and Neck Cancer Treatment at RadiologyInfo
 Head and Neck Cancer at Cancer.net (American Society of Clinical Oncology)

 
Otorhinolaryngology
Health effects of tobacco
Wikipedia medicine articles ready to translate